Pal Joey is an album by American pianist Kenny Drew recorded in 1957 and released on Riverside Records in 1958. The trio plays here pieces from the musical of the same name and other works composed by Rodgers and Hart. The album was first reissued on CD only in 1996 in the US, and in 2006 in Japan. Both editions are currently out of print.

Track listing
All pieces by Richard Rodgers and Lorenz Hart.

"Bewitched, Bothered and Bewildered" - 4:12
"Do It the Hard Way" -	5:52
"I Didn't Know What Time It Was" - 4:01
"Happy Hunting Horn" - 4:18
"I Could Write a Book" - 4:43
"What Is a Man?" - 5:08
"My Funny Valentine" - 4:09
"The Lady Is a Tramp"  - 5:41

Personnel
Kenny Drew - piano
Wilbur Ware - bass
Philly Joe Jones - drums

References

Riverside Records albums
Albums produced by Orrin Keepnews
Kenny Drew albums
1958 albums